Prohalecites is an extinct genus of ray-finned fish from the Ladinian and possibly Carnian (Triassic) of Italy. It is the oldest known teleosteomorph, a group that includes extant teleosts and their close fossil relatives. 

The type and only known species, Prohalecites porroi, was first described as "Pholidophorus porroi" by Cristoforo Bellotti, but it was later accommodated in its own genus by Wilhelm Deecke. The species "Pholidophorus" microlepidotus has occasionally been included in this genus as well, but it differed greatly from P. porroi in several respects, indicating that it was not closely related.

See also
 List of prehistoric bony fish genera

References

Prehistoric teleostei
Monotypic ray-finned fish genera
Prehistoric ray-finned fish genera
Ladinian genera
Carnian genera
Middle Triassic fish
Late Triassic fish of Europe
Triassic Italy
Fossils of Italy
Fossil taxa described in 1889